Gono Bahini (Bengali: গণবাহিনী" People's Army") was a component of the Mukti Bahini, the guerilla force which fought against the Pakistan Army during the Bangladesh Liberation War in 1971. The Gono Bahini was composed exclusively of civilians.

References

National liberation armies
National liberation movements
Bangladesh Liberation War
Military history of Bangladesh
Mukti Bahini